The First cabinet of Cvetković was the government of the Kingdom of Yugoslavia, from 5 February 1939 to 26 August 1939.

Composition

See also
List of cabinets of Yugoslavia

References

 

Politics of Yugoslavia
Government of Yugoslavia